Rita Méry is a Hungarian football striker currently playing in the Hungarian First Division for MTK Hungária, with whom she has also played the Champions League. She is a member of the Hungarian national team.

References

1984 births
Living people
Hungarian women's footballers
Hungary women's international footballers
MTK Hungária FC (women) players
Women's association football forwards
People from Veszprém
Sportspeople from Veszprém County